Ali Podrimja (28 August 1942 – 21 July 2012) was an Albanian poet. He was born in Gjakova, at the time part of Italian-controlled Albania under Italy (present day Kosovo).

After a difficult childhood due to the death of his parents, he studied Albanian language and literature in Pristina until 1966. Author of over a dozen volumes of cogent and assertive verse since 1961, he was recognized both in Kosovo and in Albania itself as a leading and innovative poet. Indeed, he was considered by many to be the most typical representative of modern Albanian verse in Kosovo and was certainly the Kosovo poet with the widest international reputation.

Podrimja's first collection of elegiac verse, Thirrje ("The calls", Pristina, 1961), was published while he was still at secondary school in Gjakova. Subsequent volumes introduced new elements of the poet's repertoire, a proclivity for symbols and allegory, revealing him as a mature symbolist at ease in a wide variety of rhymes and meters.

In the early eighties, he published the masterful collection Lum Lumi ("Lum Lumi", Pristina, 1982), which marked a turning point not only in his own work but also in contemporary Kosovo verse as a whole. This immortal tribute to the poet's young son Lumi, who died of cancer, introduced an existentialist preoccupation with the dilemma of being, with elements of solitude, fear, death and fate. Ali Podrimja is nonetheless a laconic poet. His verse is compact in structure, and his imagery is direct, terse and devoid of any artificial verbosity. Every word counts. What fascinates the readers is his compelling ability to adorn this elliptical rocky landscape, reminiscent of Albanian folk verse, with unusual metaphors, unexpected syntactic structures and subtle rhymes.

Ali Podrimja was member of European Art Center (EUARCE) of Greece. https://anatakti.wordpress.com/2011/03/24/paiania-poems/

On 21 July 2012, the French police informed the authorities of the Republic of Kosovо that Podrimja was found dead. Podrimja had lost contact with family members since many days. His premature loss is considered a loss for the Albanian art and literature.

References

Sources 
Albanian literature from Robert Elsie

Albanian-language poets
Kosovan poets
1942 births
2012 deaths
Writers from Gjakova
Kosovo Albanians
20th-century poets
Members of the Academy of Sciences and Arts of Kosovo